In mathematics, the Hodge star operator or Hodge star is a linear map defined on the exterior algebra of a finite-dimensional oriented vector space endowed with a nondegenerate symmetric bilinear form.  Applying the operator to an element of the algebra produces the Hodge dual of the element.  This map was introduced by W. V. D. Hodge.

For example, in an oriented 3-dimensional Euclidean space, an oriented plane can be represented by the exterior product of two basis vectors, and its Hodge dual is the normal vector given by their cross product; conversely, any vector is dual to the oriented plane perpendicular to it, endowed with a suitable bivector. Generalizing this to an -dimensional vector space, the Hodge star is a one-to-one mapping of -vectors to -vectors; the dimensions of these spaces are the binomial coefficients .

The naturalness of the star operator means it can play a role in differential geometry, when applied to the cotangent bundle of a pseudo-Riemannian manifold, and hence to  differential -forms. This allows the definition of the codifferential as the Hodge adjoint of the exterior derivative, leading to the Laplace–de Rham operator. This generalizes the case of 3-dimensional Euclidean space, in which divergence of a vector field may be realized as the codifferential opposite to the gradient operator, and the Laplace operator on a function is the divergence of its gradient. An important application is the Hodge decomposition of differential forms on a closed Riemannian manifold.

Formal definition for k-vectors
Let  be an -dimensional oriented vector space with a nondegenerate symmetric bilinear form , referred to here as an inner product.

extended to  through linearity.

It has the following property, which defines it completely:

 for every pair of -vectors 

Applying  to the above equation, we obtain the dual definition:

where  is the sign of the permutation .

Since Hodge star takes an orthonormal basis to an orthonormal basis, it is an isometry on the exterior algebra .

Geometric explanation 
Specifically, a non-zero decomposable -vector  corresponds by the Plücker embedding to the subspace  with oriented basis , endowed with a scaling factor equal to the -dimensional volume of the parallelepiped spanned by this basis (equal to the Gramian, the determinant of the matrix of inner products ). The Hodge star acting on a decomposable vector can be written as a decomposable-vector:

where  form an oriented basis of the orthogonal space .

A general -vector is a linear combination of decomposable -vectors, and the definition of the Hodge star is extended to general -vectors by defining it as being linear.

Examples

Two dimensions
In two dimensions with the normalized Euclidean metric and orientation given by the ordering , the Hodge star on -forms is given by

On the complex plane regarded as a real vector space with the standard sesquilinear form as the metric, the Hodge star has the remarkable property that it is invariant under holomorphic changes of coordinate. In the new coordinates

so that

proving the claimed invariance.

Three dimensions
A common example of the Hodge star operator is the case , when it can be taken as the correspondence between vectors and  bivectors. Specifically, for Euclidean R3 with the basis  of one-forms often used in vector calculus, one finds that

The Hodge star relates the exterior and cross product in three dimensions:  Applied to three dimensions, the Hodge star provides an isomorphism between axial vectors and bivectors, so each axial vector  is associated with a bivector  and vice versa, that is: .

The Hodge star can also be interpreted as a form of the geometric correspondence between an axis and an infinitesimal rotation around the axis, with speed equal to the length of the axis vector. An inner product on a vector space  gives an isomorphism   identifying  with its dual space, and the vector space  is naturally isomorphic to the tensor product . Specifically,  is a skew-symmetric operator, which corresponds to an infinitesimal rotation: that is, the macroscopic rotations around the axis  are given by the matrix exponential . That is, we may interpret the star operator as:  Under this correspondence, cross product of vectors corresponds to the commutator Lie bracket of linear operators: .

Four dimensions
In case , the Hodge star acts as an endomorphism of the second exterior power (i.e. it maps 2-forms to 2-forms, since ). If the signature of the metric tensor is all positive, i.e. on a Riemannian manifold, then the Hodge star is an involution. This particular endomorphism property of 2-forms in four dimensions makes self-dual and anti-self-dual two-forms natural geometric objects to study.

For concreteness, we discuss the Hodge star operator in Minkowski spacetime where  with metric signature  and coordinates . For one-forms,

while for 2-forms,

These are summarized in the index notation as

An extra minus sign will enter only if  contains .

Note that the combinations

take  as the eigenvalue for Hodge star operator, i.e.,

and hence deserve the name self-dual and anti-self-dual two-forms. Understanding the geometry, or kinematics, of Minkowski spacetime in self-dual and anti-self-dual sectors turns out to be insightful in both mathematical and physical perspectives, making contacts to the use of the two-spinor language in modern physics such as spinor-helicity formalism or twistor theory.

Conformal invariance

are the same.

Example: Derivatives in three dimensions
This works out as follows:  takes a 0-form (a function) to a 1-form, a 1-form to a 2-form, and a 2-form to a 3-form (and takes a 3-form to zero). For a 0-form , the first case written out in components gives:

In the second case, a vector field  corresponds to the 1-form , which has exterior derivative:

Applying the Hodge star gives the 1-form:

which becomes the vector field .

Applying Hodge star, exterior derivative, and Hodge star again:

One advantage of this expression is that the identity , which is true in all cases, has as special cases two other identities: 1)  , and 2)  . In particular, Maxwell's equations take on a particularly simple and elegant form, when expressed in terms of the exterior derivative and the Hodge star. The expression  (multiplied by an appropriate power of -1) is called the codifferential; it is defined in full generality, for any dimension, further in the article below.

One can also obtain the Laplacian   in terms of the above operations:

The Laplacian can also be seen as a special case of the more general Laplace–deRham operator  where  is the codifferential for -forms.

Duality 

For example, if  and the signature of the inner product is either  or  then . For Riemannian manifolds (including Euclidean spaces), we always have .

The above identity implies that the inverse of  can be given as

Therefore:

where  is the degree of the element operated on.

On manifolds
For an n-dimensional oriented pseudo-Riemannian manifold M, we apply the construction above to each cotangent space  and its exterior powers , and hence to the differential k-forms , the global sections of the bundle . We define the Hodge dual of a k-form , defining  as the unique (n – k)-form satisfying

More generally, if  is non-orientable, one can define the Hodge star of a k-form as a (n – k)-pseudo differential form; that is, a differential form with values in the canonical line bundle.

Computation in index notation 
The Hodge dual of a decomposable k-form is:

The factorial  accounts for double counting, and is not present if the summation indices are restricted so that . The absolute value of the determinant is necessary since it may be negative, as for tangent spaces to Lorentzian manifolds.

An arbitrary differential form can be written as follows:

The factorial  is again included to account for double counting when we allow non-increasing indices. We would like to define the dual of the component  so that the Hodge dual of the form is given by

Although one can apply this expression to any tensor , the result is antisymmetric, since contraction with the completely anti-symmetric Levi-Civita symbol cancels all but the totally antisymmetric part of the tensor.  It is thus equivalent to antisymmetrization followed by applying the Hodge star.

The unit volume form  is given by:

Codifferential 

The most important application of the Hodge star on manifolds is to define the codifferential  on k-forms.  Let

Then

while

The codifferential is not an antiderivation on the exterior algebra, in contrast to the exterior derivative.

The codifferential is the adjoint of the exterior derivative with respect to the square-integrable inner product:

where  is a -form and  a -form. This property is useful as it can be used to define the codifferential even when the manifold is non-orientable (and the Hodge star operator not defined). The identity can be proved from Stokes' theorem for smooth forms:

(The proper definition of the above requires specifying a topological vector space that is closed and complete on the space of smooth forms.

Since the differential satisfies , the codifferential has the corresponding property

The Laplace–deRham operator is given by

and lies at the heart of Hodge theory. It is symmetric:

and non-negative:

The Hodge star sends harmonic forms to harmonic forms. As a consequence of Hodge theory, the de Rham cohomology is naturally isomorphic to the space of harmonic -forms, and so the Hodge star induces an isomorphism of cohomology groups

In coordinates, with notation as above, the codifferential of the form  may be written as

Poincare lemma for codifferential 
In analogy to the Poincare lemma for exterior derivative, one can define its version for codifferential, which reads

One has to define a homotopy operator

 

We can then define cohomotopy operator as

,

The cohomotopy operator fulfills (co)homotopy invariance formula 

,

where , and is the pullback along the constant map .

Therefore, if we want to solve the equation , applying cohomotopy invariance formula we get

 where  is a differential form we are looking for, and 'constant of integration'  vanishes unless  is a top form.

Cohomotopy operator fulfills the following properties: .

.

This direct sum is another way of saying that the cohomotopy invariance formula is a decomposition of unity, and the projector operators on the summands fulfills idempotence formulas: .

These results are extension of similar results for exterior derivative.

Citations

References

 David Bleecker (1981) Gauge Theory and Variational Principles. Addison-Wesley Publishing. . Chpt. 0 contains a condensed review of non-Riemannian differential geometry.
 
 Charles W. Misner, Kip S. Thorne, John Archibald Wheeler (1970) Gravitation. W.H. Freeman. . A basic review of differential geometry in the special case of four-dimensional spacetime.
 Steven Rosenberg (1997) The Laplacian on a Riemannian manifold. Cambridge University Press. . An introduction to the heat equation and the Atiyah–Singer theorem.
 Tevian Dray (1999) The Hodge Dual Operator. A thorough overview of the definition and properties of the Hodge star operator.

Differential forms
Riemannian geometry
Duality theories
Differential operators